Kenneth Blake Blackman (born November 8, 1972) is a former professional American football player who played guard for three seasons for the Cincinnati Bengals.  His playing weight was listed as 320 pounds.  He played college football at the University of Illinois and high school at Wylie High School in Abilene, Texas. 

Blackman lives with his wife, Charity, in Monmouth, Illinois. He was married to former professional wrestler Debrah Miceli from 1998 to 2008.

References

1972 births
Living people
People from Brunswick, Georgia
Players of American football from Georgia (U.S. state)
American football offensive guards
Illinois Fighting Illini football players
Cincinnati Bengals players